Stations in Canada's CBC Radio One network each produce some local programming in addition to the network schedule.

The amount of local programming may vary from station to station. For instance, some stations in smaller markets may produce their own morning show but air an afternoon show from another station. Some stations in major markets also preempt some regular network programming in favour of an extended local schedule.

Some regional programming is also produced which is shared by all stations in a province. This most commonly applies to daily noon-hour shows, weekend morning shows and a Saturday afternoon arts and culture magazine.

Content

Local programs on CBC Radio One feature news and human interest content local to the region they serve. Each program also includes both national and local news headline segments. Some general content segments, such as business news reports, science news reports and entertainment reviews, air across the network on all local programs.

Some local segments from the various morning and afternoon programs are also aired on the national network program The Story from Here.

At the top of each hour during the morning and afternoon programs, national newscasts – World Report in the mornings and The World This Hour in the afternoons – air for the first ten minutes. A shorter local newscast typically airs at the half-hour mark.

On statutory holidays, nearly all local programming is preempted in favour of network-wide special programming. In heavily populated provinces like Ontario, the various local morning shows within often rotate broadcasting for the entire province. On Christmas Day, the entire daytime broadcasting schedule, and most of the evening is preempted for holiday music programming except for news programming such as World Report and The World at Six

Weekday programming

Local morning shows air from 5:30 am or 6 am local time, depending on the station, to 8:30 am. They are followed by a local news update, and then The Current at 8:37 am. The sole exception is Qulliq, the program from Nunavut, which begins at 6:30 am ET and airs until 9:30 am ET. As of the 2015-16 television season, the 6:00 a.m. hour of these programs outside of CBC North air on local CBC television stations.

Local afternoon shows on CBC Radio One air from 4 pm to 6 pm local time, except in Halifax, Ottawa, Toronto, Winnipeg, Calgary, Edmonton, Vancouver and Victoria, where they start at 3 pm. Rebroadcasters outside of those cities do not air the first hour of the extended afternoon shows; they stay with regional or conventional network programming and then rejoin their host station's afternoon show at 4 pm.

In addition to the standard local programming blocks, the stations in Nunavut, the Northwest Territories, and northern Quebec also preempt much of the network's afternoon schedule to produce additional local programming in aboriginal languages. See CBC North for further information. (Pre-6 am morning show start times are listed in brackets in the table)

Weekend programming
Each province and territory also has a regional weekend morning show, which airs provincewide Saturday and Sunday mornings from 6 to 9 am, and most also have a regional arts and culture magazine which airs on Saturday afternoons at 5 pm. Stations in the Atlantic provinces air an additional regional arts and culture program on Sunday afternoons at 4 pm. AT, due in part to a hole in the schedule created by the fact that Cross Country Checkup airs live across Canada at 5 pm. AT. CBI in Sydney airs the long running Island Echoes, a weekly cultural program on Saturday evenings at 8 p.m AT.

In some of Western Canada, however, distinct Saturday afternoon arts and culture magazines are no longer aired, and the stations instead air a repeat airing of the national network program Unreserved.

References 

CBC Radio One programs
Lists of radio programs
Lists of mass media in Canada